Gail Benson may refer to:
Gale Benson (1944–1972), British model and socialite who was murdered
Gayle Benson (born 1947), American businesswoman